= Juan de Jarava =

Spanish writer and physician

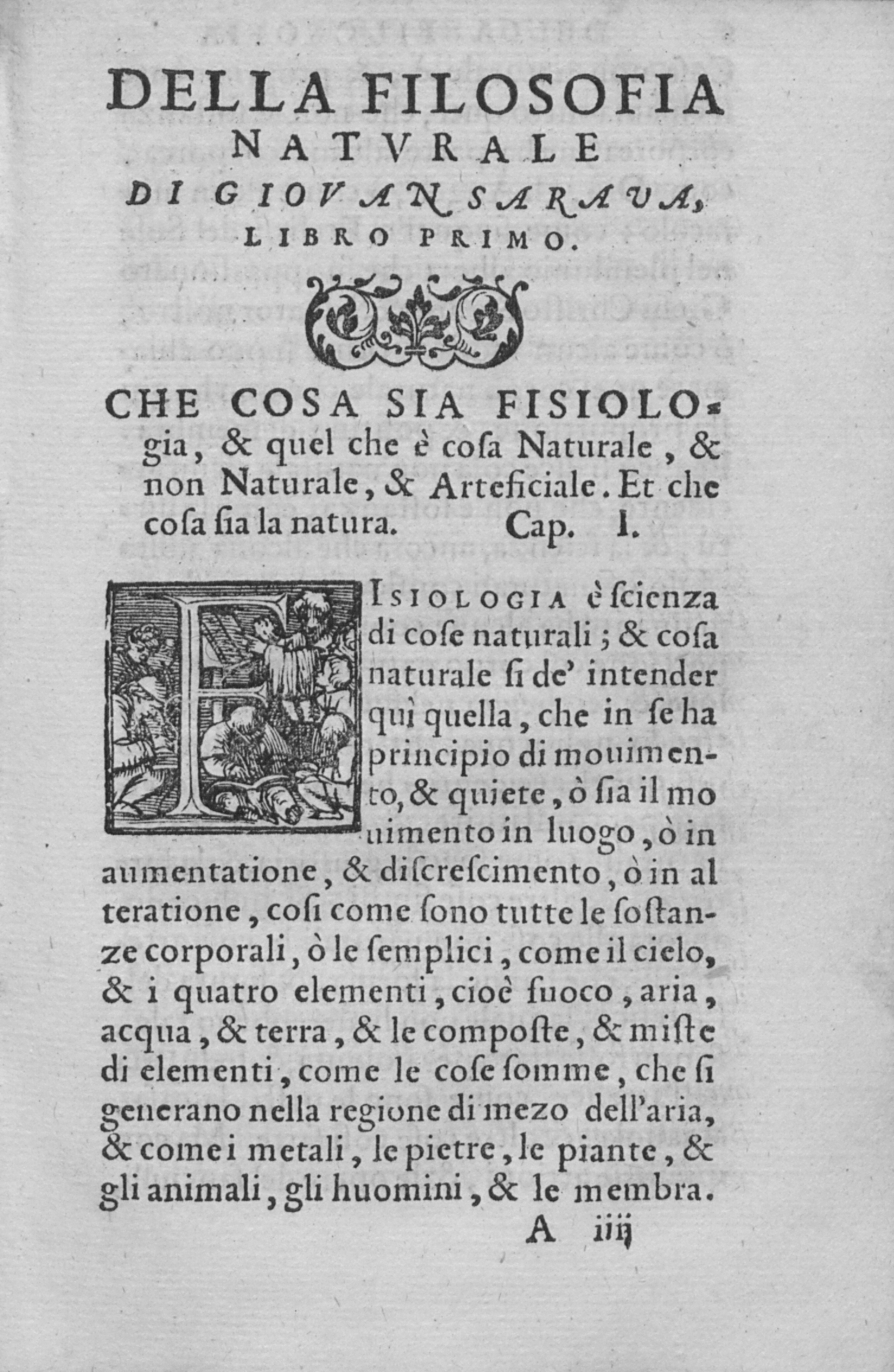
Philosophia natural, 1557

Juan de Jarava (16th century) was a Spanish writer and physician. He is well known for his work in the field of botany and natural philosophy.

== Works ==
- Philosophia natural (in Italian). Venezia: Plinio Pietrasanta. 1557.
- I Quattro Libri della Filosofia, Venezia, 1565
